Matic may refer to:

 Matić, Serbian and Croatian surname
 Matic (given name), Slovene masculine name
 Matic (album), an album by the Filipino band Cambio
 MATIC (Mobility Assessment Test & Integration Center), a radio station associated with Yosemite Sam (shortwave) broadcasts
 MATIC (Polygon blockchain platform)

See also
 -matic, a suffix in English words referring to automatic